Artsvanist is a village in the Martuni Municipality of the Gegharkunik Province of Armenia, located to the south of Lake Sevan. In the gorge south of the village is the important early 10th century monastery of Vanevan and a large but broken medieval khachkar monument nearby.

Toponymy 
The village was known as Nerkin Aluchalu and Alichali until 1968, rendered as Nizhniy Aluchalu in Russian.

History 
The village was founded in 1829-30 by migrants from Alashkert, in present-day Eastern Turkey.

Gallery

References

External links 

 
 

Populated places in Gegharkunik Province